Chelangatt Gopalakrishnan (6 June 1932 – 4 June 2010) was a journalist of Malayalam Cinema.

Childhood and early career 
He was born in Cherthala Alappuzha in Kerala to Sri Nediyedathu Kesava Pillai and Thrikkeparambil Ammukkutti Amma.   

After graduation from the Government Arts College in 1951, he started his career as a journalist in a regional newspaper, Malayali. Later, he worked for newspapers including Mathrubhumi.

Writing career 
He rediscovered several forgotten personalities including J.C. Daniel, the father of Malayalam Cinema. During this time he released several books.  

He was in the Kerala State Film Awards Jury  for several years. 

He ran a film studio named 'Ajanta Studio' at Aluva.  Many films including 'Olavum Theeravum' written by M.T. Vasudevan Nair were produced at this studio.  He had written more than 20 books about cinema alone.

Published works

 Loka Cinemayude Charithram
 Annathe Nayikamar
 Mukham Nokkathe
 Mukhathodu Mukham
 Chalachithra Abhinayam
 Vincent Muthal Vincent Vare
 Cinema Nirmmanam Keralathil
 Cinema Nirmmanam Pillerukaliyo
 Cinemayude Katha
 J C Danielinte Jeevitha Katha
 Vayalar (Biography of Vayalar Ramava Varma)
 Sangeetha Nataka Prasthanam Keralathil
 Malayala Nataka Charithram
 Aadyakala Malayala Cinema Naayikamaar
 Malayala Cinemayile Vaanavarum Veenavarum
 Malayala Cinema - Charithram Vichithram
 Indian Cinemayude Charithram
 Nataka Kala
 Charithrathilillatha Viplavakarikal
 Dakshinendiyayile Viplavakaarikal
 Marakkapppetta Viplavakaarikal
 Pathrapravarthanam Keralathil

and other books in various categories including children literature.

In popular culture
In J C Daniel's biographical movie by Kamal, Celluloid, Chelangatt Gopalakrishnan is played by Sreenivasan.

References

External links
Mukham nokate
DC Books

2010 deaths
Writers from Alappuzha
1935 births
Journalists from Kerala
Malayalam-language journalists
20th-century Indian journalists
Indian male novelists
20th-century Indian novelists
Indian male journalists
Novelists from Kerala
20th-century Indian male writers